Paint Township, Ohio may refer to:
Paint Township, Fayette County, Ohio
Paint Township, Highland County, Ohio
Paint Township, Holmes County, Ohio
Paint Township, Madison County, Ohio
Paint Township, Ross County, Ohio
Paint Township, Wayne County, Ohio

See also
Paint Township (disambiguation)

Ohio township disambiguation pages